This is a list of prominent people who were born in Dagbon, lived for a significant period in Dagbon or were born to a Dagomba parent or parents.

Arts

Abubakari Lunna
Samata Angel

Education
Haruna Yakubu
R. P. Baffour

Entertainment

 Rascalimu
 Rocky Dawuni 
 Sidiku Buari
 Sheriff Ghale
 Sherifa Gunu
 Fancy Gadam; afropop, dancehall and reggae musical artiste.

Information Communication Technology
 Mohammed-Sani Abdulai, Computer Scientist and Informatics researcher.

Media
 Alhassan S. Suhuyini
 Mahama Shaibu

Military & Police
 Bawa Andani Yakubu

Politics

 Aliu Mahama
 Imoro Yakubu Kakpagu
 Muntaka Mohammed Mubarak
 Alhaji Muhammad Mumuni
 Ras Mubarak
 Haruna Iddrisu
 Inusah Fuseini
 Alhassan Suhuyini

Religious
 Yusuf Soalih Ajura
 Saeed Abubakr Zakaria

Sport

 Abdul Majeed Waris
 Abukari Damba
 George Alhassan
 Hamza Mohammed
 Mubarak Wakaso
 Salifu Mudasiru
 Sherifatu Sumaila
 Mukarama Abdulai

Other
 Yakubu II

References

External links
 Home for news, history, customs, and information about Dagbon and Northern Region of Ghana
 Online Fifa Database Searching SoFifa
 Ghana to establish Neurosurgery Centre GhanaWeb
 University of Ghana Medical School University of Ghana
 Convention People's Party
 Unearth Kufuor¹S Evil Deeds Alhaji Mahama - Ghana Web GhanaWeb
 Rocky Dawuni Official Website
 The United Nations Foundation: Working to Create a Better Tomorrow United Nations
 Rocky Dawuni Biographical movie "Rocky Dawuni: Branches of the Same Tree".

Muslim communities in Africa
Ethnic groups in Ghana
Dagbon
Former monarchies of Africa
Dagbon
Former countries in Africa